Rarandoi Veduka Chudham is a 2017 Indian Telugu-language romantic comedy film directed by Kalyan Krishna Kurasala and produced by Nagarjuna Akkineni on Annapurna Studios banner. It stars Naga Chaitanya, Rakul Preet Singh, Jagapathi Babu, and Sampath Raj. The music is composed by Devi Sri Prasad. Cinematography by N. Vishweshwar and editing by Gautham Raju. The film was released on 26 May 2017. It was remade in Kannada as Seetharama Kalyana.

Plot
The story begins in a village as a tale of three best friends: Krishna (Jagapathi Babu), Adinarayana (Sampath Raj), and Prabhakar (Irshad). Adi has a huge family, and one day, his elder sister Priya (Priya) gets engaged. Ten days before her wedding, she elopes, leaving behind a letter that she has loved another man and has gone to live with him. Due to some misunderstanding, Krishna is suspected, and the friendship turns into enmity. The story moves forward 25 years, with Bhrahmaramba (Rakul Preet Singh), the innocent and heavily pampered only daughter of Adi, who has little to no exposure to the outside world. She dreams of marrying a man who has the qualities of a prince, as said by her grandmother. Shiva (Naga Chaitanya), the son of Krishna, meets Bhrahmaramba in his brother Kishore's (Vennela Kishore) marriage with Bhramarambha's friend and falls in love with her at first sight. After playful encounters, they separate ways. Bhramarambha eventually comes to Vizag, Shiva's hometown, for her studies. She quickly finds out that Shiva lives in Vizag, and they spend a lot of time together, with her sharing everything with him. She tells him that she is not interested in a relationship with him. Shiva loves her, but in fear of rejection, does not reveal his love. Later they get into an argument, with Shiva revealing his love for her and being frustrated with her not having a clarity on her life and that she keeps waiting for a prince and does not realize what she has. Bhramarambha furiously returns home and accepts a marriage proposal by her cousin out of anger. The rest of the story is about how Shiva finally makes Brahmaramba realize him as her prince and resolves disputes between both families.

Cast

 Naga Chaitanya as Shiva 
 Rakul Preet Singh as Bhramaramba 
 Jagapathi Babu as Krishna
 Sampath Raj as Adinarayana 
 Irshad as Prabhakar 
 Vennela Kishore as Kishore  
 Kousalya as Kaushalya, Adi's wife
 Annapurna as Lakshmi, Adi's mother
 Chalapathi Rao as Suryanarayana, Adi's father  
 Priya as Priya 
 Anitha Chowdary as Shiva's sister
 Pruthviraj as Dorababu
 Banerjee as Banerjee
 Surekha Vani as Surekha  
 Posani Krishna Murali as Rambabu
 Raghu Babu as Bhaskar
 Saptagiri as Bangaram
 Madhunandan as Ravi
 Satya Krishnan
 Thagubothu Ramesh as Govind
 Duvvasi Mohan 
 Hyper Aadi
 Chitti
 Prabhu
 Rajitha
 Avantika Vandanapu as young Bhramarambha

Soundtrack

The music was composed by Devi Sri Prasad and was released on Aditya Music Company. The audio function was grandly held on 21 May 2017 at Annapurna Studios.

Production
The director of the film is Kalyan Krishna Kurasala. The film's first look was released on 29 March 2017 on Ugadi by Nagarjuna through his official Facebook page. Naga Chaitanya shared through Twitter that two posters of the film were released at the same time since Producer Nagarjuna and director Kalyan Krishna was not able to decide which poster to go with. It was Naga Chaitanya's third collaboration with music director Devi Sri Prasad after 100% Love and Dhada and first collaboration with director Kalyan Krishna Kurasala.

Reception

Box office 
Rarandoi Veduka Chudham, in two days collected a total gross of  11.86 Crores and a share of  5.84 Crores worldwide. In its first week, the film collected a total gross of  32 crores and a share of  18.50 Crores worldwide. The film collected a total gross of  50 Crores and a share of  28 Crores worldwide in its lifetime run.

In the first weekend, Rarandoi Veduka Chudham beat movies like Sachin: A Billion Dreams at the US box office by collecting a total gross of 369,672 .

Critical reception 
Firstpost gave 3 out of 5 stars stating, "Rarandoi Veduka Choodham ends up being a crowd-pleasing film in the end. The trick lies in making you yearn for the feeling of being together, despite all odds. It’s the theme of most family dramas in Telugu films and Rarandoi Veduka Choodham is no different".

IndiaGlitz gave 3 out of 5 stars stating, "A wafer-thin and predictable story, 'RVC' comes with an excellent characterization of the heroine, and largely fine performances.  Proper spacing of songs was needed.  All said, there are elements that could appeal to family audiences".

The Times of India gave 2.5 out of 5 stars stating, "Rarandoi Veduka Chudham uses the age-old run-of-the-mill set-up to establish the story and its characters. As far as the plot is concerned, there is nothing new that one can expect from the family drama - fathers pampering their children, children falling in love with the enemy’s son and the clichés. Finally, when things are set to take an offbeat turn, a simple clarification of a misunderstanding brings the plot to a happy ending; bummer!".

Awards and nominations

References

External links 
 

2017 films
Indian romantic comedy films
Films scored by Devi Sri Prasad
2010s Telugu-language films
Telugu films remade in other languages
2017 romantic comedy films
Indian romantic action films
Films set in Andhra Pradesh
Films set in Visakhapatnam
Films shot in Andhra Pradesh
Films shot in Visakhapatnam
Films directed by Kalyan Krishna